Ardnacrusha is a village in County Clare, Munster, Ireland, located on the northern bank of the River Shannon. The name derives from the phrase Ard na Croise meaning "the height of the cross", due to a large cross marker placed there in 1111 to mark the boundary of the Diocese of Limerick.

In 1841, the village consisted of 17 houses and a population of 136. In 2002, the population was 926.

Ardnacrusha is located near the site of the Ardnacrusha power plant, constructed in the 1920s. By 1935, it was producing 80 per cent of Ireland's electricity.

See also
List of towns and villages in Ireland
List of towns in the Republic of Ireland/2006 Census Records

References

External links

Towns and villages in County Clare
Populated places on the River Shannon